The Police Reform Act 2002 (c.30) is an Act of the Parliament of the United Kingdom.

Amongst the provisions of the Act are the creation of the role of Police Community Support Officers, who have some police powers whilst not being 'sworn' constables, and the ability for chief constables to confer a more limited range of police powers on other (non-sworn) individuals as part of Community Safety Accreditation Schemes. The Act also replaced the Police Complaints Authority with the Independent Police Complaints Commission (later replaced by the Independent Office for Police Conduct).

Section 59

Section 59 of the Act is a common tool now used by police constables and police community support officers (PCSOs) to seize vehicles being used in an anti-social manner. Vehicles can be seized if the police officer / PCSO reasonably believes that a mechanically propelled vehicle is being used in a manner:
causing, or likely to cause alarm, distress or annoyance to the public,
and:
contravening section 3 (careless/inconsiderate driving), or
contravening section 34 (prohibition of off-road driving/driving other than a road) of the Road Traffic Act 1988.

Vehicles should be issued with a warning first, unless this is impracticable. An example of it being impractical would be the offenders leaving the vehicle/making off or the vehicle being unregistered and unable to be traced - therefore a warning unable to be placed. If an officer also reasonably believes a warning has been given within the past 12 months - whether or not  recorded on the Police National Computer or similar system, they can seize the vehicle immediately.

References

Law enforcement in the United Kingdom
Anti-social behaviour
United Kingdom Acts of Parliament 2002
Police legislation in the United Kingdom